Federal Highway 18 (Fed. 18 ) is a toll-free part of the federal highway corridors in Mexico.

References

018